Jon Briggs (born 24 January 1965) is an English television, radio presenter and narrator.  He is best known for his voice-over work, and particularly as the British voice used by Apple Inc.'s Siri virtual assistant software.

Career
Briggs's voiceover credits include appearing as the voiceover statistician in over 1,800 episodes of the BBC TV quiz show The Weakest Link (2000–2012, 2017) and as continuity announcer for BBC Radio 2 (1996–2009) and Channel 4 (1988–1990). Briggs was the first presenter on air when QVC launched in the UK in 1993. Briggs also provided the narration for the start of the drum and bass song "Blood Sugar" by Pendulum.

Briggs's radio credits include the breakfast show Oxford AM for BBC Radio Oxford (1985–1987), the breakfast show Morning Edition for BBC Radio 5 (1990–1992), Night Ride for BBC Radio 2 and The Weekend Wireless Show for LBC (1998–2003). His reporting credits include BBC Radio 4's  PM,  Today,  The World at One and The World Tonight, as well as travelogue and transport programmes Breakaway and Going Places.

Briggs now works as a conference moderator and facilitator and owns the London-based artists' agency Excellent Talent Ltd.

In October 2017, he was a contestant on the celebrity version of the UK quiz show Pointless. 

In July 2019, Briggs co-presented BBC Radio 4's "Voice in the Machine" episode of the Archive on 4 series.

In November 2020 Briggs launched the podcast You're On the Air! talking to UK broadcasters about the skill of broadcasting.

Siri 
In 2007 Briggs recorded his voice for text-to-speech software developed by ScanSoft, later acquired by Nuance Communications. In 2011, Nuance's software was used by Apple Inc. for their British Male version of Siri, the personal assistant application for Apple devices. Briggs's voice is renamed "Daniel" for these purposes.
The voice is also the default British voice for Voice-Over on the iPhone, built-in software found within accessibility. This software reads everything out on the screen to enable blind and visually impaired people to use a phone independently. 
It has been rumoured that "Daniel UK” was dropped as the default Siri British Male voice option once Apple realised that Jon Briggs' voice was actually a well-known voice in the UK, as Apple wanted the voices used to be "anonymous" unknowns. However, he is available as an option in Settings, as above.
The Daniel UK voice has since become an internet meme, particularly in meme compilations, for the absurd things that can be said in the monotone voice.

References

External links
www.jonbriggs.com — Jon Briggs's website.
www.youreontheair.co.uk - Podcast website

https://www.youtube.com/watch?v=fJLxEvL6eCo — BBC Radio 2 Voice Party Video from The Jeremy Vine Show
The iconic voices of technology - BBC Technology "Meet the real Siri, and other iconic voices of technology"

1965 births
British radio personalities
Living people
People educated at The Dragon School
People educated at Magdalen College School, Oxford
Radio and television announcers